Bromholm Priory was a Cluniac priory, situated in a coastal location near the village of Bacton, Norfolk, England

History
Bromholm Priory, also known as Bacton Abbey, was founded in 1113 by William de Glanville, Lord of Bacton, and was originally subordinate to Castle Acre Priory until 1195 when it was exempted by Pope Celestine III. King Henry III visited the priory in 1223 to take the holy waters and dedicate to the relics; lands nearby were controlled by the all-powerful Justiciar Hubert de Burgh.  From this priory we have the Bromholm Psalter dated to the early fourteenth century. The priory was suppressed in 1536. All that now remains are the ruins of the gatehouse, Chapter House, and the northern transept of the Priory Church.

It was an important object of pilgrimage as it claimed to possess a piece of the True Cross, mentioned as the 'holy cross of Bromeholme'  in Chaucer's The Reeve's Tale and William Langland's Vision of Piers Plowman.

It was a benefice of the Paston family and is featured in their letters.

In 1940 the base of the central tower of the priory church was modified to act as a pillbox in case of German invasion.

Considerable graphic visualisations of what the priory and its lands looked like throughout its history were produced in 2019 and 2020 by members of the Paston Portal.   

"A Short History of Bromholm Priory" published 1911.

References 

 British History Online (2003-5). Houses of Cluniac monks — The priory of Bromholm. Retrieved 7 December 2005.

Cockerell, Sydney Carlyle, Sir. Two East Anglian psalters at the Bodleian library. Oxford: Printed for the Roxburghe Club by J. Johnson, 1926. (Facsimile of Bolmholm Psalter)

Cluniac monasteries in England
Monasteries in Norfolk
1113 establishments in England
1536 disestablishments in England
Religious organizations established in the 1110s
Grade I listed buildings in Norfolk
Christian monasteries established in the 12th century
Order of Saint Benedict